Father Cigarette (Spanish:El padre Pitillo) is a 1946 Chilean comedy film directed by Roberto de Ribón.

Cast
 Lucho Córdova as Padre Pitillo  
 Conchita Buxón 
 Chela Bon 
 Nicanor Molinare

References

Bibliography 
 Jacqueline Mouesca. Erase una vez el cine: diccionario-- realizadores, actrices, actores, películas, capítulos del cine mundial y latinoamericano. Lom Ediciones, 2001.

External links 
 

1946 films
1946 comedy films
Chilean comedy films
1940s Spanish-language films
Films based on works by Carlos Arniches
Chilean black-and-white films